J'irai dormir chez vous (meaning "I am going to sleep in your home") is a French travel documentary series aired on French TV channels Canal+, France 5 and Voyage. It is hosted by Antoine de Maximy. Each episode features self-recorded videos from the solo trip of the host in a country. The aim of the host is to try to dine and stay the night with the locals, to discover the local trends and way of life.

References

French documentary television series